Chapar Khaneh is the Persian-language term that refers to the postal service system used throughout the Achaemenid Empire. It was created by Cyrus the Great and later developed by Darius the Great as the royal method of communication throughout the empire. Each Chapar Khaneh was a station mainly located along the Royal Road, an ancient highway that was reorganized and rebuilt by Darius I, which stretched from Sardis in modern-day Turkey to Susa in modern-day Iran, connecting most of the major cities of the Achaemenid Empire.

Herodotus' description of the Royal Road and the various Chapar Khanehs along it is as follows:

"Now the true account of the road in question is the following: Royal stations exist along its whole length, and excellent caravanserais; and throughout, it traverses an inhabited tract, and is free from danger. In Lydia and Phrygia there are twenty stations within a distance Of 94½ parasangs. On leaving Phrygia the Halys has to be crossed; and here are gates through which you must needs pass ere you can traverse the stream. A strong force guards this post. When you have made the passage, and are come into Cappadocia, 28 stations and 104 parasangs bring you to the borders of Cilicia, where the road passes through two sets of gates, at each of which there is a guard posted. Leaving these behind, you go on through Cilicia, where you find three stations in a distance of 15½ parasangs. The boundary between Cilicia and Armenia is the river Euphrates, which it is necessary to cross in boats. In Armenia the resting-places are 15 in number, and the distance is 56½ parasangs. There is one place where a guard is posted. Four large streams intersect this district, all of which have to be crossed by means of boats. The first of these is the Tigris; the second and the third have both of them the same name, though they are not only different rivers, but do not even run from the same place. For the one which I have called the first of the two has its source in Armenia, while the other flows afterwards out of the country of the Matienians. The fourth of the streams is called the Gyndes, and this is the river which Cyrus dispersed by digging for it three hundred and sixty channels. Leaving Armenia and entering the Matienian country, you have four stations; these passed you find yourself in Cissia, where eleven stations and 42½ parasangs bring you to another navigable stream, the Choaspes, on the banks of which the city of Susa is built. Thus the entire number of the stations is raised to one hundred and eleven; and so many are in fact the resting-places that one finds between Sardis and Susa."

The Chapars were express couriers who were provided with fresh supplies and horses at each station along the way, allowing them to quickly complete their way without having to procure supplies on their own or wait for their horse to rest.

See also
Angarium
Angarum

References

Achaemenid Empire
Postal systems
Iranian inventions